MacLean, also spelt Maclean and  McLean, is a Gaelic surname Mac Gille Eathain, or,  Mac Giolla Eóin in Irish Gaelic), Eóin being a Gaelic form of Johannes (John). The clan surname is an Anglicisation of the Scottish Gaelic "Mac Gille Eathain", a patronymic meaning "son of Gillean". Gillean means "the Servant of [Saint] John [the Baptist]"), named for Gilleathain na Tuaidh, known as "Gillian of the Battleaxe", a famous 5th century warrior.

Eachan Reaganach and his brother Lachlan were descended from Gilleathain na Tuaidh, and are the progenitors of the clan. The family grew very powerful throughout the Hebrides and Highlands through alliances with the Catholic Church in Scotland in the 9th century, the MacDonalds in the 13th century, and the MacKays and MacLeods in the 16th century. Other spellings of the name include McClean, MacLaine, McLaine, McLain, MacLane, and many others.

Duart Castle is the seat of Clan MacLean.

McLean 
 Aaron McLean (born 1983), English professional footballer
 Adam McLean, Scottish authority on alchemical texts and symbolism
 Agnes McLean (1918–1994), Scottish trade unionist and politician
 A. J. McLean (born 1978), American musician and singer
 Al McLean (born 1937), Canadian politician from Ontario
 Alan McLean (New Zealand cricketer) (1911–2003), New Zealand cricketer
 Alex McLean (born 1947), American photographic artist
 Allan McLean (Australian politician) (1840–1911), Premier of Victoria 1899–1900, Gippsland's first Federal representative 1901-1906
 Allan McLean (outlaw) (1855–1881), Canadian outlaw and son of Donald McLean, fur trader and explorer
 Andrea McLean, British weather forecaster and television personality
 Angela McLean (biologist), University of Oxford Professor of Mathematical Biology
 Angela McLean, Lieutenant-Governor of Montana (2014-16)
 Archibald McLean (disambiguation), various
 Bethany McLean, business writer for Vanity Fair magazine; formerly Fortune magazine; well known for her work in uncovering the Enron scandal
 Bill McLean (1918-1996), Australian soldier and rugby union player, Wallabies captain
 Bitty McLean, British/Jamaican reggae singer
 Bruce McLean, Scottish artist
 Brian McLean (disambiguation), various
 Bryan McLean (1946–1998), American rock musician
 Daniel McLean (disambiguation), various
 David McLean (disambiguation), various
 David McLean (businessman) (born 1938), founder of the McLean Group of Companies
 Dominique "SonicFox" McLean (born 1991), American esports player
 Don McLean (born 1945), American singer and songwriter
 Donald McLean (fur trader) (1805–1864), Hudson's Bay Company fur trader and explorer, father of outlaw Allan McLean
 Donald McLean (New Zealand politician) (1820–1877), New Zealand politician and government official
 Donald McLean (pastoralist) (1780–1855) pioneer wheat farmer of South Australia
 Doug McLean, Jr. (1912–1961), Australian rugby union and rugby league player
 Doug McLean, Sr. (1880–1947), Australian rugby union and rugby league player
 Edward Beale McLean (1889–1941), American newspaper publisher, Washington Post
 Ernest McLean (1926–2012), American R&B guitarist
 Errol McLean (born 1952), Guyanese cyclist
 Evalyn Walsh McLean (1886–1947), American Washington socialite, wife of Edward Beale McLean
 Francis H. McLean (1869-1945), American social work pioneer, leader in the Charity Organization Society Movement
 George F. McLean (born 1929), American philosopher
 George P. McLean (1857–1932), American politician
 Gloria Hatrick McLean (1918–1994), wife of American actor Jimmy Stewart
 G. S. McLean, founder and long-time past President of Full Gospel Bible Institute (now Eston College), pastor, lecturer and writer
 Ian McLean (1929–1965), Australian rules footballer
 Ian McLean (politician) (born 1934), New Zealand politician
 Jamel McLean (born 1988), American basketball player
 John McLean (1785–1861), American politician and jurist from Ohio
 John McLean (disambiguation), other people named John McLean
 Jackie McLean (1931–2006), American jazz musician
 James "Buddy" McLean, Irish-American gangster
 James Hamilton McLean (1936), American malacologist
 Jason C. McLean (born 1977), Canadian stage actor
 Jim McLean (born 1937), Scottish football player and manager
 Jock McLean (1908–1988), Scottish footballer
 John McLean (1785–1861), American politician and jurist from Ohio
 John McLean (Illinois politician) (1791–1830), American politician from Illinois
 Kenny McLean (born 1992), Scottish footballer
 Kirk McLean (born 1966), Canadian professional ice hockey player
 Lachlan McLean (born 1968), American radio broadcaster
 Lenny McLean a.k.a. “Guv'nor” (1949–1998), English weightlifter and boxer
 Luke McLean (born 1987), Australian-born Italian rugby union player
 Malcom McLean (1914–2001), inventor of containerized shipping
 McLean (singer) (born 1980), Anthony McLean a British singer previously known as Digga.
 McLean Stevenson (1929–1996), American actor
 Martha McLean, local activist
 Margaret McLean (1845–1923), Australian women's rights advocate
 Max McLean (born 1953), stage actor, writer, and producer
 Michelle McLean (contemporary), Namibian woman crowned Miss Universe in 1992
 Motto McLean (born 1925), Canadian ice hockey player
 Nathaniel McLean (1815–1905), Union Army Civil War general 
 Nixon McLean (born 1973), West Indian cricketer
 Paul McLean (rugby union) (born 1953), Australian rugby union player and rugby union administrator
 Ray (Scooter) McLean, head coach of the Green Bay Packers football team in 1958
 Roderick McLean (19th century), Scottish poet who attempted to assassinate Queen Victoria
 Samuel McLean (U.S. Consul), U.S. Consul for Trinidad de Cuba; 1849–1853, born 1797 in Alexandria, Virginia
 Samuel McLean (congressman), Congressman for Montana, born 1826 in Summit Hill, Pennsylvania
 Samuel McLean (politician), politician of the Canadian province of Newfoundland and Labrador
 Sara McLean, former Miss Scotland 2011 runner-up and Big Brother 2012 housemate
 Stuart or Stewart McLean, various
 Tim McLean (1986–2008), Canadian murder victim
 Tommy McLean (born 1947), Scottish football player and manager
 Tre McLean (born 1993), American basketball player in the Israeli Basketball Premier League
 Walter McLean (born 1936), Canadian clergyman and politician from British Columbia, Manitoba, and Ontario
 William B. McLean (1914-1976), United States Navy physicist, conceived and developed the heat-seeking Sidewinder missile
 Wilmer McLean (1814-1882), American farmer in whose house the American Civil war ended in 1865

MacLean
 Alick Maclean (1872–1936), English composer
 Alistair MacLean (1922–1987), Scottish novelist
 Allan Maclean of Torloisk, officer in the British Army responsible for Canada not taken over by rebels during the American War of Independence
 Alejandro Maclean, Spanish film producer and aerobatics pilot
 Alison Maclean, Canadian film director of music videos
 Andrew Dyas MacLean (1896–1971), Canadian naval officer and publisher
 Angus MacLean (1915–2000), Canadian politician, former Premier of Prince Edward Island
 Archer Maclean (contemporary), British computer games programmer
 Archibald MacLean, British Army and Royal Air Force officer
 Bonnie MacLean, American artist
 Brett MacLean (born 1988), Canadian ice hockey player
 Bryan MacLean (1946–1998), American singer, guitarist and songwriter
 Calum Maclean (folklorist) (1915–1960), Scottish folklorist, collector, ethnographer and author
 Charles Hector Fitzroy Maclean of Duart, Baron Maclean (1916–1990), Scottish nobleman, Lord Chamberlain to Queen Elizabeth II 1971–1984
 Craig MacLean (born 1971), Scottish track cyclist
 Danielle MacLean (fl.1990s–present), Australian filmmaker
 David Maclean (born 1953), English politician from Penrith and The Border
 Don Maclean (comedian) (born 1944), British comedian and television host
 Don MacLean (basketball) (born 1970), American basketball player and broadcaster
 Sir Donald Maclean (British politician) (1864–1932), English politician
 Donald Maclean (spy) (1913–1983), British intelligence agent and spy for the Soviet Union during WWII
 Doug MacLean (born 1954), Canadian sportscaster and former head coach and general manager
 Dougie MacLean (born 1954), Scottish singer-songwriter
 Douglas MacLean (1890–1967), American silent motion picture actor, producer, and writer
 Eileen MacLean (1949–1996), American educator and politician
 Every Maclean (fl. 1870s), member of the New Zealand Legislative Council
 Sir Ewen Maclean, professor of Obstetrics and Gynaecology
 Sir Fitzroy Maclean, 1st Baronet (1911–1996), Scottish diplomat, adventurer, writer, and politician
 Sir George Maclean,  (1795-1861), Commissary General in the British Army.
 George Maclean (1801-1847), Governor of Gold Coast
 Harry Aubrey de Maclean (1848–1920), (Kaïd, General Sir), soldier and instructor to the Moroccan army
 Hector MacLean (disambiguation)
 Hector Lachlan Stewart MacLean (1871–1897), Scottish recipient of the Victoria Cross
 James Mackenzie Maclean (1835-1906), Welsh politician
 Jill MacLean (born 1941), English-Canadian author
 John Duncan MacLean (1873–1948), Canadian politician, Premier of British Columbia 1927–1928
 John Maclean MA (1879–1923), Scottish politician
 John Frederick MacLean (1921-1973) American sports broadcaster
 John MacLean (ice hockey) (born 1964), Canadian professional ice hockey player
 John Norman Maclean (contemporary), American author
 The Juan MacLean, American electronic musician
 Katherine MacLean (1925-2019), American science fiction author
 Kenny MacLean (1956–2008), Scottish-Canadian musician
 Malcolm Alexander MacLean (1842–1895), Canadian politician, Mayor of Vancouver, BC 1886–1887
 MacLean & MacLean, a comedy/parody duo in Canada
 Natalie MacLean, Canadian wine writer
 Neil Maclean (politician) (1875–1953), Scottish politician
 Norman Maclean (1902–1990), American novelist and academic
 Norman Hector Mackinnon Maclean (Tormod MacGill-Eain) (1936-2017), Scottish Gaelic comedian, novelist, poet, musician and broadcaster. 
 Paul MacLean (ice hockey) (born 1958), Canadian ice hockey player
 Paul D. MacLean (1913–2007), American physician and brain scientist
 Rachel Maclean, a Scottish multi-media artist 
 Rachel Maclean (born 1965), UK politician
 Ranald MacLean (born 1938), Scottish judge
 Robert MacLean (born 1970), American Air Force, Border Patrol, and Federal Air Marshal Service veteran
 Rob MacLean (born 1958), Scottish television presenter, football commentator and sports writer
 Ronald MacLean Abaroa (born 1949), Bolivian politician
 Ron MacLean (born 1960), Canadian sportscaster
 Rory MacLean (born 1954), Canadian and British author
 Sarah Jean Munro Maclean (1873–1952), Canadian painter
 Sorley MacLean (1911–1996), Scottish Scots Gaelic poet
 Steven MacLean (disambiguation), various
 Steven MacLean (astronaut) (born 1954), Canadian astronaut
 Steve MacLean (footballer) (born 1982), retired Scottish footballer and current first team coach at St. Johnstone
 Tara MacLean (born 1973), Canadian singer and songwriter
 Veronica Maclean (1920–2005), British food writer and hotelier
 Vince MacLean (born 1944), Canadian politician and former Speaker of the Nova Scotia House of Assembly

McClean
 James McClean (born 1989), Irish footballer

Maclean Feudal Barons in Scotland
 The Honorable Sir Lachlan Maclean of Duart Baron of Duart
 Sir Charles Edward Maclean of Dunconnel Bt, 2nd Baronet of Strachur and Glensluain, Baron Strachur, and 16th Hereditary Keeper and Captain of Dunconnel in the Isles of The Sea
 Lorne Gillean Ian Mclaine of Lochbuie Baron of Moy
 Malcolm Fraser Maclean of Kingairloch Baron of Kingairloch
 Kenneth Lee MacLean Baron of Denboig
 David Ian Mclean Baron of Preston

Maclean Life Peers
 Charles Maclean, Baron Maclean
 David Maclean, Baron Blencathra

Fictional characters 
 Chris McLean, host of the Total Drama series
 Lord Maclean, a character in "The Revenge of Hamish", a poem by Sydney Lanier
 Tristan McLean, the mortal father of Piper McLean created by Rick Riordan.
 Will McLean, narrator in the 1980 novel The Lords of Discipline by Pat Conroy
 Piper McLean, a character in Rick Riordan's The Heroes of Olympus series. She is a demigod daughter of Aphrodite and Tristan McLean.

See also
 Clan Maclean
 Maclean baronets
 John McClane, fictional character
 MacLaine surnames
 McLaine surnames
 McLain surnames
 MacLane surnames

References

English-language surnames